Zelzal-1 (meaning "Earthquake-1") is an Iranian-made heavy artillery rocket with an estimated range of 160 km. It is believed to be owned by the Iranian Armed Forces and Hezbollah. The rocket received relatively little use but was the basis for the more successful Zelzal-2 artillery rocket.

Users

See also
Aerospace Force of the Islamic Revolutionary Guard Corps
Armed Forces of the Islamic Republic of Iran
Defense industry of Iran
Equipment of the Iranian Army
Fateh-110
Zelzal-2
Zelzal-3

References 

Weapons of Iran
Ballistic missiles of Iran
Military equipment introduced in the 1990s

he:זלזאל